Duke Dawson (born October 13, 1995) is an American football cornerback for the Pittsburgh Steelers of the National Football League (NFL). He played college football at Florida.

Early years
Dawson is from Cross City, Florida, and went to Dixie County High School there.

College career
Despite speculation that he would forgo his senior season and declare for the 2017 NFL Draft, Dawson later announced that he would return to Florida for his senior year.  During his senior season, he defended 13 passes, leading the Gators and tying for third in the SEC.  His accomplishments lead him to be selected for the Coaches All-SEC First-team.

Professional career

New England Patriots
The New England Patriots selected Dawson in the second round with the 56th overall pick of the 2018 NFL Draft. On September 6, 2018, Dawson was placed on injured reserve with a hamstring injury. On November 13, 2018, the Patriots activated Dawson off of injured reserve. Despite being taken off injured reserve Dawson was inactive for the rest of the season. He did not appear in a single game. The Patriots would go on to reach and win Super Bowl LIII where they beat the Los Angeles Rams 13-3.

Denver Broncos
On August 30, 2019, Dawson and a seventh-round pick were traded to the Denver Broncos for a sixth-round pick.

In Week 14 of the 2020 season, Dawson suffered a torn ACL, and was placed on injured reserve on December 16, 2020.

On September 1, 2021, Dawson was placed on the reserve/PUP list to start the season. He was activated on November 8, then waived and re-signed to the practice squad. His contract expired when the teams season ended on January 8, 2022.

Carolina Panthers
On July 29, 2022, Dawson signed with the Carolina Panthers. He was placed on injured reserve on August 23. He was waived on August 25, 2022.

Pittsburgh Steelers
On October 12, 2022, Dawson was signed to the Pittsburgh Steelers practice squad. He signed a reserve/future contract on January 10, 2023.

References

Further reading

External links
Player profile at Patriots.com
Prospect profile at NFL.com
Collegiate profile at FloridaGators.com

1995 births
Living people
People from Dixie County, Florida
Players of American football from Florida
American football cornerbacks
Florida Gators football players
New England Patriots players
Denver Broncos players
Carolina Panthers players
Pittsburgh Steelers players